The M76 Otter was an amphibious cargo carrier used by the United States Marine Corps (USMC).

History

It was designed and built by Pontiac Motor Division in the late 1940s and intended as a replacement for the M29 Weasel. It entered service with the USMC in the early 1950s and many saw action in the Vietnam War. It was replaced in USMC service by the M116 Husky.

Preserved vehicles on display 
There are Otters on display at the following locations:
 Pacific War Museum, Guam
 Kensington American Legion, Kensington, New Hampshire
 Marine Corps Mechanized Museum, Camp Pendleton

References

External links

Video of M76 used as a firefighting vehicle

Military vehicles of the United States
Tracked amphibious vehicles
Armored personnel carriers of the United States
Amphibious armoured personnel carriers
Military vehicles introduced in the 1950s